The Cinema Audio Society Award for Outstanding Achievement in Sound Mixing for Television Non Fiction, Variety or Music – Series or Specials is an annual award given by the Cinema Audio Society to sound mixers for their outstanding achievements in sound mixing for non fiction, variety or music series/specials television productions.

Winners and nominees

1990s

2000s

2010s

2020s

See also
 Primetime Emmy Award for Outstanding Sound Mixing for a Nonfiction or Reality Program (Single or Multi-Camera)
 Primetime Emmy Award for Outstanding Sound Mixing for a Variety Series or Special

References

External links
 Cinema Audio Society Official website

Cinema Audio Society Awards
Awards established in 1999